Ulla-Britt Söderlund (August 12, 1943 – July 21, 1985) was a Swedish costume designer who designed the costumes for some twenty films in Sweden, Denmark, and England. In 1976, she won an Oscar for the costumes of Stanley Kubrick's film Barry Lyndon along with Milena Canonero.

Career
The first films in which Soderlund had the main responsibility for the costumes were for a Danish-Swedish co-production. She worked with director Henning Carlsen in the film adaptation of Hamsun's novel Sult (Hunger) in 1966 and in the film People Meet and Sweet Music Fills the Heart in 1967.

Subsequently, she collaborated with many renowned directors, including Gabriel Axel, Mai Zetterling (Doctor Glas), Jan Troell (The Emigrants), Hans Alfredson, and Stanley Kubrick. The creation of 1700-styled costumes in Kubrick's Barry Lyndon earned her an Academy Award and a nomination for an English BAFTA Award.

In the late 1970s, Söderlund worked on the Danish acclaimed television series Matador and, in 1983, she made costumes for Hans Alfredson's film The Simple-Minded Murder.

Awards

References

External links

1943 births
1985 deaths
Swedish costume designers
People from Växjö
Best Costume Design Academy Award winners